Diante Maurice Garrett (born November 3, 1988) is an American professional basketball player for Ironi Kiryat Ata of the Israeli Basketball Premier League. He played college basketball for Iowa State University.

High school career
Garrett attended Harold S. Vincent High School in Milwaukee, Wisconsin. As a senior in 2006–07, he averaged 15.2 points and 5.3 assists per game, going on to be named the Milwaukee Player of the Year and was named first team all-state by the Milwaukee Journal Sentinel.

College career
In his freshman season, Garrett started four games and played in all 32 games; he averaged 6.3 points and was second on the team in assists with 91.

In his sophomore season, he was one of the Big 12's top playmakers, ranking third in the league and 36th nationally in assists (5.0 apg); his 161 assists ranked 16th on ISU's single-season assist chart. Garrett was also one of two players to start all 32 games and was second on the team in scoring (9.8 ppg) and averaged 3.3 rebounds per game.

In his junior season, Garrett was one of the Big 12 Conference's best point guards for the second straight year, ranking third in the league and 38th nationally in assists (5.1 apg); he recorded 164 assists to rank 15th on ISU's single-season assist chart. He was one of three players to start all 32 games, averaging 9.2 points and 2.5 rebounds per game.

In his senior season, he produced one of the best seasons at point guard in Iowa State history and was one of the nation's most improved players. Garrett earned All-Big 12 second team honors and USBWA All-District VI accolades while averaging 17.3 points, 6.1 assists and 1.7 steals per game. He led the Big 12 in assists (6.1 apg), the first Cyclone to top the league in assists since Jacy Holloway in 1996–97. Garrett graduated from Iowa State in May 2011 with a Bachelor of Liberal Studies degree.

College statistics

|-
| style="text-align:left;"| 2007–08
| style="text-align:left;"| Iowa State
| 32 || 4 || 22.2 || .351 || .220 || .699 || 1.8 || 2.8 || .9 || .1 || 6.3
|-
| style="text-align:left;"| 2008–09
| style="text-align:left;"| Iowa State
| 32 || 32 || 32.9 || .407 || .220 || .707 || 3.3 || 5.0 || .9 || .1 || 9.8
|-
| style="text-align:left;"| 2009–10
| style="text-align:left;"| Iowa State
| 32 || 32 || 31.6 || .438 || .352 || .694 || 2.5 || 5.1 || 1.3 || .2 || 9.2
|-
| style="text-align:left;"| 2010–11
| style="text-align:left;"| Iowa State
| 32 || 31 || 36.7 || .413 || .319 || .825 || 3.7 || 6.1 || 1.7 || .2 || 17.3

Professional career

2011–12 season
Garrett went undrafted in the 2011 NBA draft. On July 23, 2011, he signed a one-year deal with KK Zagreb of Croatia. On November 7, 2011, he parted ways with Zagreb. The next day, he signed with JSF Nanterre of France for the rest of the 2011–12 season.

2012–13 season
In July 2012, Garrett joined the Phoenix Suns for the 2012 NBA Summer League. On October 1, 2012, he signed with the Suns. On November 5, 2012, Garrett made his NBA debut recording 2 points, 2 assists and 1 steal in a 99–124 loss to the Miami Heat. During the 2012–13 season, he had multiple assignments with the Bakersfield Jam of the NBA D-League.

2013–14 season
In July 2013, Garrett re-joined the Phoenix Suns for the 2013 NBA Summer League. On September 27, 2013, he signed with the Oklahoma City Thunder. However, he was later waived by the Thunder on October 25, 2013. On October 31, 2013, he was acquired by the Tulsa 66ers as an affiliate player. The next day, he was traded to the Iowa Energy. On November 13, 2013, he signed with the Utah Jazz.

2014–15 season
On July 10, 2014, Garrett was traded to the Toronto Raptors in exchange for Steve Novak and a 2017 second round pick. On July 19, 2014, he was waived by the Raptors. On September 24, 2014, he signed with the Portland Trail Blazers. However, he was later waived by the Trail Blazers on October 25, 2014.

On November 4, 2014, Garrett was reacquired by the Iowa Energy. On February 12, 2015, he was named to the Futures All-Star team for the 2015 NBA D-League All-Star Game as a replacement for Lorenzo Brown. On February 26, he was traded to the Grand Rapids Drive in exchange for Willie Reed.

2015–16 season
In July 2015, Garrett joined the Los Angeles Clippers for the 2015 NBA Summer League. 

The following month, he signed with Maccabi Ashdod of the Israeli Basketball Premier League. In 32 starts he averaged 19.0 points (3rd in the league), 6.2 assists (2nd), and 1.4 steals per game, with an .826 free throw percentage.

2017–18 season
For the 2017–18 season, Garrett signed with the Italian team Auxilium Torino. On February 18, 2018, Garrett won the 2018 edition of the Italian Basketball Cup with Fiat Torino by beating Germani Basket Brescia 69–67 in the Finals.

2018–19 season
In July 2018, Garrett signed with Turkish club Tofaş, where he finished third in the Turkish league during the 2018–19 season. Meanwhile, he also personally averaged 18.4 points, 2.8 rebounds, 6.1 assists and 0.7 steals per contest, while shooting 43.5% from beyond the arc, in the team's EuroCup games.

2020–21 season
After a long hiatus due to personal injuries and the COVID-19 pandemic, Garrett signed with EuroCup club Promitheas Patras of the Greek Basket League, on July 31, 2020. On January 4, 2021, he was released from the Greek team.

On January 26, 2021, Garrett signed with Giessen 46ers of the Basketball Bundesliga. In 19 games, he averaged 15.1 points, 4.9 assists (8th in the league), and 1.5 steals (6th) per game.

2021–22 season
On August 2, 2021, Garrett signed in Puerto Rico with Gigantes de Carolina. 

In 2021-22 he played for the Israeli team Ironi Nes Ziona. In 29 starts he averaged 15.6 points (10th in the league), 4.8 assists (9th), and 1.5 steals (10th) per game, with an .859 free throw percentage.

2022–23 season
In the summer of 2022, Garrett signed with Ironi Kiryat Ata of the Israeli Basketball Premier League.

NBA career statistics

Regular season

|-
| align="left" | 
| align="left" | Phoenix
| 19 || 0 || 7.8 || .327 || .200 || .500 || .8 || 1.6 || .5 || .0 || 2.1
|-
| align="left" | 
| align="left" | Utah
| 71 || 0 || 14.8 || .381 || .375 || .833 || 1.4 || 1.7 || .6 || .1 || 3.5
|-
| align="left" | Career
| align="left" |
| 90 || 0 || 13.3 || .373 || .351 || .682 || 1.2 || 1.7 || .6 || .1 || 3.2

Honours
Greek Basketball Super Cup: (2020)

Personal
Garrett is the son of Dick and LaRisa Garrett. His father played five seasons in the NBA for the Los Angeles Lakers, Buffalo Braves, New York Knicks and Milwaukee Bucks, averaging 10.3 points per game. His brother, Damon, played basketball at Wisconsin-Whitewater.

References

External links

 
 Euroleague.net Profile
 Profile at Eurobasket.com
 Profile at DraftExpress.com

1988 births
Living people
Alvark Tokyo players
American expatriate basketball people in Croatia
American expatriate basketball people in France
American expatriate basketball people in Israel
American expatriate basketball people in Japan
American men's basketball players
Auxilium Pallacanestro Torino players
Bakersfield Jam players
Basketball players from Milwaukee
Giessen 46ers players
Grand Rapids Drive players
Iowa Energy players
Iowa State Cyclones men's basketball players
Ironi Kiryat Ata players
Ironi Nes Ziona B.C. players
KK Zagreb players
Lega Basket Serie A players
Maccabi Ashdod B.C. players
Nanterre 92 players
Phoenix Suns players
Point guards
Shooting guards
Tofaş S.K. players
Undrafted National Basketball Association players
Utah Jazz players